The Jefferson Trust Company is a historic building located in Hoboken, Hudson County, New Jersey, United States. The building was built in 1912 and was added to the National Register of Historic Places on February 13, 1986. The original trust company failed during the Great Depression and the building passed on to a succession of owners. The building was constructed using granite and brick. Much of the original plaster interior remains intact. The building underwent a renovation into luxury condos in the 2000s.

See also
National Register of Historic Places listings in Hudson County, New Jersey

References

Buildings and structures in Hoboken, New Jersey
Bank buildings on the National Register of Historic Places in New Jersey
Commercial buildings completed in 1912
National Register of Historic Places in Hudson County, New Jersey
1912 establishments in New Jersey
New Jersey Register of Historic Places